The men's 100 metres event at the 2018 African Championships in Athletics was held on 1 and 2 August in Asaba, Nigeria.

Medalists

Results

Heats
Qualification: First 3 of each heat (Q) and the next 6 fastest (q) qualified for the semifinals.

Wind:Heat 1: -0.5 m/s, Heat 2: -0.9 m/s, Heat 3: -0.2 m/s, Heat 4: -0.8 m/s, Heat 5: -1.1 m/s, Heat 6: -0.6 m/s

Semifinals
Qualification: First 2 of each semifinal (Q) and the next 2 fastest (q) qualified for the final.

Wind:Heat 1: -0.8 m/s, Heat 2: -0.9 m/s, Heat 3: -0.7 m/s

Final
Wind: -2.1 m/s

References

2018 African Championships in Athletics
100 metres at the African Championships in Athletics